The 2021 Liga Femenina was the 1st season of the Peruvian Liga Femenina. The season began on 29 May and ended on 4 September with the final.

Planned to be held in 2020, the inaugural season of the Liga Femenina was delayed until 2021 due to the COVID-19 pandemic.

Alianza Lima won their first title after defeating Universitario by a 1–0 score in the final. As champions, Alianza Lima qualified for the 2021 Copa Libertadores Femenina.

Competition format
The season was divided into two stages: First stage and Final stage (play-offs). The First stage was played under a single round-robin format with the 13 teams playing each other once. The Final stage was contested by teams ranked 1st to 6th in the First stage, with teams ranked 1st and 2nd directly qualified for semifinals and teams ranked 3rd to 6th qualified for a previous qualifying round or repechage to reach the semifinals. Winners of semifinals played the final to decide the national champion.

Teams
13 teams played in the 2021 Liga Femenina season. In February 2020, the Peruvian Football Federation (FPF) invited the women's division of Liga 1 and Liga 2 clubs and all women's football clubs nationwide to participate in the first Liga Femenina with a maximum of 16 teams. Clubs had until 6 March 2020 to submit their application and were later evaluated on different criteria before being accepted.

Eventually, 14 teams completed and approved the application process to play in the 2020 Liga Femenina but the tournament had to be postponed due to the COVID-19 pandemic. In december 2020, FPF announced that the Liga Femenina would start in May 2021 and the 14 teams had to confirm their participation until 22 January 2021.

On 27 May 2021 it was announced that Real Apurímac decided to withdraw from the tournament, reducing the teams to 13.

Stadia and locations

Because of the COVID-19 pandemic, the whole tournament was played in Lima at Estadio San Marcos.

First stage

Results
The match schedule was decided based on the draw which was held on 24 May 2021.

Final stage
In the final stage, if a match was tied after 90 minutes, extra time was not played and the match was decided directly by a penalty shoot-out, except for the final where extra time and penalty shoot-out would be used to decide the winner if necessary.

All match times listed are PET (UTC−5).

Bracket

Repechage

Semi-finals

Final

Top scorers

References

Peru
Peru
Peru
Women's sports leagues in Peru
Peru